The Pacific Coast Championships was an annual men's tennis tournament founded as the Pacific States Championships or the Pacific Coast Sectional Championships. It was the second-oldest ongoing tennis tournament in the United States and ran from 1889 until 2013. Its final edition, known by its sponsored name SAP Open, was an ATP World Tour 250 series event on the Association of Tennis Professionals tour and played indoors on a hard court surface at the SAP Center at San Jose.

History
The tournament began in 1889 as the Pacific Coast Championships at the Old Del Monte Lodge in Monterey, California and was won by William H. Taylor. It is the second-oldest tennis tournament in the United States, predated only by the U.S. Championships (current US Open). The tournament predates the Australian Open and the French Open. The following year, 1890, the tournament moved to the Hotel Rafael in San Rafael where it was held until 1900 when it relocated to the Berkeley Tennis Club in Berkeley. Barry MacKay bought the tournament in 1970 at Berkeley. In 1972 and 1973 the event was hosted by the Round Hill Country Club in Alamo. The tournament's location moved indoor to the Cow Palace in 1974 and changed venues to what is now the Bill Graham Civic Auditorium. before coming to San Jose in 1994, shortly after the HP Pavilion was built.

Before tennis' open era, the tournament had both men's and women's events. During World War II, it had special servicemen competitions.

Earlier title sponsors include Redwood Bank, Fireman's Fund, Transamerica, Volvo, and Comerica. More recently, it was the Sybase Open from 1994 through 2001 and the Siebel Open from 2002 through 2004. The tournament was known as the SAP Open from 2005 until the last edition in 2013.

Silicon Valley Sports and Entertainment who bought half of it from Barry MacKay when the tournament moved to San Jose and the other half in 1995. SVS&E also owns the San Jose Sharks. MacKay owned and ran the tournament from 1970 until 1995.

The 2013 event was the last held in the Bay Area. Future tournaments will be held in Rio de Janeiro. After McKay sold the venue, the SAP Open was downgraded to an ATP 250-level event with fewer highly ranked players entering. The highest ranked player for the 2013 SAP Open was Milos Raonic, ranked 13th.

Multiple winners

Singles tournament
Men who have won the singles tournament more than once are: William H. Taylor, Samuel Hardy, Sumner Hardy, George F. Whitney, Melville H. Long, Maurice McLoughlin, George C. Janes, William Johnston, Fred Perry, Don Budge, Robert Riggs, Ted Schroeder, Barry MacKay, Stan Smith, Arthur Ashe, John McEnroe, Michael Chang, Andre Agassi, Pete Sampras, Mark Philippoussis, Andy Roddick, Andy Murray, and Milos Raonic.

Women who have won the single's tournament more than once are: Helen Wills Moody, Helen Jacobs, Edith Cross, Alice Marble, Margaret Osborne duPont, Dorothy Head Knode, Darlene Hard, and Margaret Court.

William Johnston has the most singles tournament wins with ten victories.

Overall winners
The players who have won the most combined singles, doubles and mixed doubles titles in this tournament are:
 John McEnroe – 14
 William Johnston – 10 (all in singles)
 Don Budge – 9
 Helen Wills Moody – 9
 Peter Fleming – 7 (all in doubles)

Past finals

Men's singles

Women's singles

 From 1948 through 1950, the Pacific Coast Championships were combined with the U.S. Women's Hardcourt Championships.

Men's doubles

Women's doubles

Mixed doubles

See also
 Pacific Southwest Championships – tournament held in Los Angeles from 1927 through 2012.

References

External links
2000 results
2005 results

 
Defunct tennis tournaments in the United States
Indoor tennis tournaments
Hard court tennis tournaments in the United States
Sports in San Jose, California
1889 establishments in California
2013 disestablishments in California